Pirow may refer to:

People
 Brent Pirow (born 1959), South African tennis player
 Oswald Pirow (1890–1959), South African lawyer and politician

Places
 Pirow, Brandenburg, Germany